George Augustus Mushbach (January 6, 1850 – December 27, 1901) was an American lawyer and politician who served in the Virginia House of Delegates and Virginia Senate representing Alexandria.

References

External links

1850 births
1901 deaths
19th-century American politicians
Members of the Virginia House of Delegates
Politicians from Alexandria, Virginia
People from Hamburg, New Jersey